Gilpin County is a county located in the U.S. state of Colorado, smallest in land area behind only the City and County of Broomfield. As of the 2020 census, the population was 5,808. The county seat is Central City. The county was formed in 1861, while Colorado was still a territory, and was named after Colonel William Gilpin, the first territorial governor.

Gilpin County is part of the Denver-Aurora-Lakewood, CO Metropolitan Statistical Area.

Geography

It is the second-smallest county by area in Colorado.

Adjacent counties
 Boulder – north
 Jefferson – east
 Clear Creek – south
 Grand – west

Major Highways
  State Highway 46
  State Highway 72
  State Highway 119
 Central City Parkway

National protected areas
Arapaho National Forest
James Peak Wilderness
Roosevelt National Forest

State protected area
Golden Gate Canyon State Park

Scenic trail and byway
Continental Divide National Scenic Trail
Peak to Peak Scenic and Historic Byway

Demographics

At the 2000 census there were 4,757 people, 2,043 households, and 1,264 families in the county.  The population density was 32 people per square mile (12/km2).  There were 2,929 housing units at an average density of 20 per square mile (8/km2).  The racial makeup of the county was 94.37% White, 0.53% Black or African American, 0.82% Native American, 0.69% Asian, 0.19% Pacific Islander, 1.53% from other races, and 1.87% from two or more races.  4.25% of the population were Hispanic or Latino of any race.
Of the 2,043 households 26.90% had children under the age of 18 living with them, 53.00% were married couples living together, 5.70% had a female householder with no husband present, and 38.10% were non-families. 26.80% of households were one person and 3.70% were one person aged 65 or older.  The average household size was 2.32 and the average family size was 2.81.

The age distribution was 21.10% under the age of 18, 5.80% from 18 to 24, 37.40% from 25 to 44, 30.00% from 45 to 64, and 5.70% 65 or older.  The median age was 38 years. For every 100 females there were 112.70 males.  For every 100 females age 18 and over, there were 116.10 males.

The median household income was $51,942 and the median family income  was $61,859. Males had a median income of $38,560 versus $30,820 for females. The per capita income for the county was $26,148.  About 1.00% of families and 4.00% of the population were below the poverty line, including 1.40% of those under age 18 and 6.10% of those age 65 or over.

Communities

Cities
Black Hawk
Central City

Census-designated places
Coal Creek (also in Boulder and Jefferson counties)
Rollinsville

Other
Nevadaville
Russell Gulch

Historic district
Central City/Black Hawk Historic District

See also

Outline of Colorado
Index of Colorado-related articles
Arapahoe County, Kansas Territory
Mountain County, Jefferson Territory
List of statistical areas in Colorado
Denver–Aurora combined statistical area
Front Range Urban Corridor
Hidee Gold Mine
National Register of Historic Places listings in Gilpin County, Colorado

References

External links

Gilpin County Government website
Colorado County Evolution by Don Stanwyck
Colorado Historical Society

 

 
Colorado counties
1861 establishments in Colorado Territory
Populated places established in 1861